Bathymophila asphala is a species of sea snail, a marine gastropod mollusk in the family Solariellidae.

Description
The diameter of the shell attains 8.2 mm.

Distribution
This marine species is endemic to New Zealand and occurs off Norfolk Island and the Three Kings Islands at depths between 326 m and 757 m.

References

 Marshall B.A. (1999). A revision of the Recent Solariellinae (Gastropoda: Trochoidea) of the New Zealand region. The Nautilus 113(1): 4-42

External links

asphala
Gastropods of New Zealand
Gastropods described in 1999